Paired box gene 2, also known as Pax-2, is a protein which in humans is encoded by the PAX2 gene.

Function 

The Pax Genes, or Paired-Box Containing Genes, play important roles in the development and proliferation of multiple cell lines, development of organs, and development and organization of the central nervous system. The transcription factor gene PAX2 is important in the regionalized embryological development of the central nervous system.  In mammals, the brain is developed in three regions:  the forebrain, midbrain, and the hindbrain. Concentration gradients of fibroblast growth factor 8 (FGF8) and Wingless-Type MMTV Integration Site Family, Member 1 (Wnt1) control expression of Pax-2 during development of the Mesencephalon, or midbrain. Similar patterning during embryological development can be observed in “basal chordates or ascidians,” in which organization of the central nervous system in ascidian larvae are also controlled by fibroblast growth factor genes. PAX2 encodes for the transcription factor which appears to be essential in the organization of the midbrain and hindbrain regions, and at the earliest can be detected on either side of the sulcus limitans, which separates motor and sensory nerve nuclei.

PAX2 encodes paired box gene 2, one of many human homologues of the Drosophila melanogaster gene prd. The central feature of this transcription factor gene family is the conserved DNA-binding paired box domain. PAX2 is believed to be a target of transcriptional suppression by the tumor suppressor gene WT1. Pax 2 is a transcription factor controlled by the signaling molecules Wnt1 and Fgf8. Pax2 along with other transcription factors Pax5, Pax8, En1, and En 2 are expressed across the Otx2-Gbx2 boundary in the mid-hindbrain region. These transcription factors work with the signaling molecules Wnt1 and Fgf8 to maintain the MHB organizer. The MHB controls midbrain and cerebellum development. Pax2 is the earliest known gene to be expressed across the Otx2-Gbx2 boundary. It is first expressed in the late primitive streak stage and is expressed in a narrow ring centered at the MHB during somitogenesis. Transgene expression of the mid-hindbrain and developing kidney is directed by Pax2. There are three distinct MHB-specific enhancers in the upstream region of Pax2. Expression at the MHB from the four-somite stage onwards is directed by the two late enhancers in the proximal and distal regions of Pax2. The early enhancer located in the intermediate region activates the mid-hindbrain region of late gastrula embryos. The activation of Pax2, Pax5, and Pax8 is a conserved feature of all vertebrates.

Clinical significance 

Pathologically, Pax2 has been demonstrated to activate hepatocyte growth factor (HGF) gene promoter, and both have been indicated as playing a role in human prostate cancers.

Mutations within PAX2 have been shown to result in optic nerve colobomas and renal hypoplasia. Alternative splicing of this gene results in multiple transcript variants. Pax2 and Pax8 are also necessary for the formation of the pronephros and subsequent kidney structures. Pax2 and Pax8 regulate the expression of Gata3. Without these genes mutations in the urogenital system arise.

Pax2 misexpression is frequently observed in proliferative disorders of the kidney. For example, Pax2 is highly expressed in polycystic kidney disease (PKD), Wilms' tumor (WT), and renal cell carcinoma (RCC). Pax2 expression in these diseases appears fuel cell cycling, inhibit cell death, and confer resistance to chemotherapy. Due to its role in these diseases, Pax2 is an attractive therapeutic target and a number of methods for inhibiting its activity have been investigated. In fact, a small-molecule was recently identified with the ability to disrupt Pax2 mediated transcription by blocking Pax2 from binding to DNA.

Interactions 

PAX2 has been shown to interact with PAXIP1.

See also 
 Pax genes

References

Further reading

External links 
 GeneReviews/NCBI/NIH/UW entry on Renal Coloboma Syndrome
 

Transcription factors